New South Wales Swifts are an Australian netball team based in Sydney, New South Wales. Since 2017 they have represented Netball New South Wales in Suncorp Super Netball. Between 2008 and 2016, they played in the ANZ Championship. The team was formed in 2007 when Netball New South Wales merged its two former Commonwealth Bank Trophy league teams, Sydney Swifts and Hunter Jaegers. In 2008, Swifts were the inaugural ANZ Championship winners. Swifts were also grand finalists in 2015 and 2016. They won their second and third premierships in 2019 and 2021.

History

ANZ Championship
Between 2008 and 2016, Swifts played in the ANZ Championship. Swifts were formed in late 2007 when Netball New South Wales merged its two former Commonwealth Bank Trophy league teams, Sydney Swifts and Hunter Jaegers, in order to enter a single team in the 2008 ANZ Championship. During the 2008 regular season Swifts won 10 of their 13 matches and finished second behind Waikato Bay of Plenty Magic. With a team coached by Julie Fitzgerald and captained by Catherine Cox, Swifts subsequently defeated Magic in both the major semi–final and the grand final to become the inaugural ANZ Championship winners. Swifts went through the entire 2010 regular season home and away undefeated, winning 13 consecutive matches and finishing as minor premiers. They were the first team in the history of the ANZ Championship to do this. However they subsequently lost both the major semi-final and the preliminary final to Adelaide Thunderbirds and Magic respectively and finished the season in third place.

The 2011, 2012 and 2013 seasons proved to be a turbulent time for Swifts. After fifteen seasons as Sydney Swifts/New South Wales Swifts head coach, 2011 was the last season that Julie Fitzgerald served as head coach. Following a controversial "internal review", Fitzgerald was replaced as head coach by Lisa Beehag. The review was  conducted during the 2011 season. Catherine Cox and Liz Ellis publicly criticized Netball New South Wales for distracting players with the review and even alleged that it was responsible for Swifts losing the 2011 minor semi-final. Beehag subsequently informed Cox that she would not be needed as a captain or player the following season. Cox subsequently departed for West Coast Fever. Other senior and emerging players including  Rebecca Bulley, Courtney Tairi and Ashleigh Brazill also left. It was also alleged that the controversy led to some emerging New South Wales players, including Verity Simmons, Gabi Simpson and Kim Ravaillion, taking up contracts with rival teams. Under the leadership of Fitzgerald and Fox, New South Wales Swifts had been champions in 2008 and had reached the final series/play-offs in 2010  and 2011.  Under Beehag's two-year reign, the team failed to make the finals. In 2013, the Swifts finished eighth. At the end of 2013 Beehag's contract was not renewed.

Beehag was subsequently replaced by Rob Wright. Wright guided Swifts to two successive grand finals in 2015 and 2016. However, on both occasions they lost out to Queensland Firebirds.

Regular season statistics

Suncorp Super Netball
Since 2017, Swifts have played in Suncorp Super Netball. In addition to Swifts, the new league featured a second Netball New South Wales team, Giants Netball. Two veteran members of the 2016 Swifts roster, Kimberlee Green and Susan Pettitt, subsequently switched to the Giants, who were coached by former Swifts head coach, Julie Fitzgerald. The 2018 season saw Rob Wright replaced by Briony Akle. In 2019, Akle guided Swifts to their second premiership when they won the Suncorp Super Netball title. Despite losing their new captain, Maddy Proud, to injury early in the season, Swifts finished the regular season in second place. In the major semi-final, they lost to Sunshine Coast Lightning. However, they then defeated Melbourne Vixens in the preliminary final. In the grand final they faced Lightning again but time defeated them 64–47 to emerge as champions. In 2021 with a team coached by Briony Akle and co-captained by Maddy Proud and Paige Hadley, Swifts won their second Suncorp Super Netball title. In the grand final they defeated Giants Netball 63–59.

Regular season statistics

Grand finals
ANZ Championship

Suncorp Super Netball

Home venues
Between 2008 and 2019, Swifts played the majority of their home games at the Sydney Olympic Park Sports Centre. In 2020, together with Giants Netball, Swifts were due to start to playing their home games at the Ken Rosewall Arena. However these plans were put on hold until 2021 due to the COVID-19 pandemic.

Notes
  Also referred to as the State Sports Centre and the QuayCentre. 
  Also referred to as the Acer Arena, the Allphones Arena or the Qudos Bank Arena.

Notable players

2023 squad

Internationals

 Jade Clarke
 Natalie Metcalf
 Helen Housby
 Sonia Mkoloma

 Kayla Johnson
 Laura Langman
 Katrina Rore
 Courtney Tairi

 Samantha Wallace

Captains

Award winners
ANZ Championship MVP

Notes
  Award was shared with Joanne Harten (Waikato Bay of Plenty Magic).

ANZ Championship Player of the Year

ANZ Finals Series MVP

Australian ANZ Championship Player of the Year 

Holden Cruze ANZ Championship Player of the Year 

QBE NSW Swifts Most Valued Player

NSW Swifts Members' Player of the Year

NSW Swifts Players' Player of the Year

NSW Swifts Coaches' Award

AFLW players 
Several Swifts player have also played women's Australian rules football in the AFLW

 Elle Bennetts
 Ashleigh Brazill
 Taylah Davies
 Erin Hoare
 Sharni Layton

Coaches
Head Coaches

Assistant coaches

Main sponsors

Premierships

Suncorp Super Netball
Winners: 2019, 2021
ANZ Championship
Winners: 2008
Runners Up: 2015, 2016
Minor Premiership: 2010

NNSW Waratahs

Netball New South Wales Waratahs are the reserve team of New South Wales Swifts.  They play in the Australian Netball League. In 2011 Waratahs became the first team other than Victorian Fury to win the ANL title. In the grand final they defeated Fury 55–46.

References

External links
  NSW Swifts on Facebook
  NSW Swifts on Twitter

 
Suncorp Super Netball teams
Netball teams in Sydney
Netball teams in Australia
ANZ Championship teams
Swifts
2007 establishments in Australia
Sports clubs established in 2007